is a Japanese table tennis player. He is also a member of the JOC Elite Academy (JOCエリートアカデミー) in Tokyo and a member of Ryukyu Asteeda starting from the 3rd season (2020/21) in TLeague. He was formerly a member of Kinoshita Meister Tokyo in the 2nd season (2019/20).

He won the mixed doubles title at the 2019 World Junior Table Tennis Championships with Miyuu Kihara. In 2020, Yukiya, won the 2020 Japanese National title, defeating Harimoto in the finals.

Career records
Singles
World Junior Table Tennis Championships: 2nd (2018)

Doubles
World Junior Table Tennis Championships: 3rd (2017)
Asian Junior and Cadet Championships: 1st (2019), 3rd (2017).

Mixed Doubles
World Junior Table Tennis Championships: 1st (2019)
Asian Junior and Cadet Championships: 3rd (2019).

Team
World Junior Table Tennis Championships: 2nd (2017, 2018), 3rd (2019)
Asian Junior and Cadet Championships: 1st (2016), 3rd (2014, 2015, 2018).

References

Externjal links

2001 births
Japanese male table tennis players
Living people
Sportspeople from Tokyo
People from Chōfu, Tokyo
Kinoshita Meister Tokyo players
World Table Tennis Championships medalists